Usama Young (born May 8, 1985) is a former American football safety. He played college football at Kent State University. He was drafted by the New Orleans Saints in the third round of the 2007 NFL Draft. He also played for the Cleveland Browns.

Early years
Usama was born in the North East section of Washington D.C. to Dr. Khaula Murtadha and Leroi A. Young (1950-2016). Usama is the youngest son of their four boys. Usama Young attended Largo High School in Largo, Maryland and was a letterman in football, baseball, and track. He started to play football at the age of 8. As the youngest, Usama was given the opportunity to learn from his older brothers who pushed him to never cry, complain or make excuses. When Usama was 12 he was playing football in a local pee-wee football game. During the middle of the game a rabid dog ran onto the field and terrorized the young players, coaches and family members who were on the sidelines watching. To everyone's surprise the twelve-year-old Usama was able to tackle the dog, tie the dog up using the chains from the down markers and successfully restore order to the pee-wee football game.

By the time Usama was a freshman in high school he developed a work ethic that would stay with him throughout his football career. As a senior in high school, he was a second team All-State honoree. Young graduated from Largo High School in 2003. He worked as a vendor at FedExField during home games of the Washington Redskins while in high school. This was revealed during the SuperAd that he and his father were featured in during Super Bowl XLIII.

College career
Young was regarded as one of the top defensive prospects to emerge from Kent State in the last three decades. A three-year starter, his collegiate career totals include starting 37 of 45 games, with 198 tackles (129 solo), three forced fumbles, two fumble recoveries, nine interceptions with 21 yards in returns, 21 pass defenses and a blocked kick.

As a freshman in 2003, Young started 9 of 12 games and had 49 tackles, two interceptions, 8 pass defenses and 2 fumble recoveries. In 2004, Young started 10 games and missed one game due to a hip strain. In those games, Young had 39 tackles and 3 interceptions  with 57 return yards. In 2005, his junior year, Young started seven games and had 50 tackles with 4 for losses, 2 interceptions, and 3 passes deflected. A second-team All-Mid-American Conference selection as a senior, Young made a career-high 60 tackles (39 solo) in 2006 as well as 2 interceptions, 3 forced fumbles, 6 pass defenses, and one blocked punt.

Professional career

New Orleans Saints (2007–2010)
Selected in the third round as the 66th overall pick in the 2007 NFL Draft, Young signed with the New Orleans Saints on June 11, 2007 with a three-year contract. As a rookie in 2007, Young played 14 games and made 25 tackles and deflected one pass. In 2008, Young started 2 of 15 games played and made 50 tackles, 8 passes deflected, and 2 interceptions. Young won the Super Bowl XLIV title with the Saints after the 2009 season, in which Young played 12 games with 1 start and had 8 tackles, 1 pass deflected, and 1 interception returned 24 yards. In his final season with the Saints in 2010, Young made 23 tackles and 3 passes deflected.

Cleveland Browns (2011–2012)
On July 28, 2011, Young signed as a free agent with the Cleveland Browns. In the 2011 season, Young played all 16 games for the first time in his career and started 8 games. Young made 70 tackles, 1 pass deflected, and 1 interception returned for 28 yards. The following season in 2012, Young played 13 games and started 11 and made 53 tackles, 7 passes deflected, and 3 interceptions returned for 44 yards. The Browns cut Young on April 2, 2013.

Oakland Raiders (2013–2015)
Young signed with the Oakland Raiders on April 9, 2013.

NFL career statistics

References

External links
Official site
Oakland Raiders bio
Kent State Golden Flashes bio

1985 births
Living people
People from Largo, Maryland
Players of American football from Maryland
American football safeties
Kent State Golden Flashes football players
New Orleans Saints players
Cleveland Browns players
Oakland Raiders players
Players of American football from Washington, D.C.